The Swedish Social Insurance Agency is a government agency that administers social insurance in Sweden.

Responsibilities  
Among other the agency is responsible for administering the following benefits.

 Immigrant support and allowances
 Pensions and disability benefits and allowances
 Parental leave benefit (
 Maternity benefits
 Child allowance
 Housing benefit and allowance
 Sickness benefit
 Rehabilitation allowance
 Enforcement of domestic and international child support orders

See also 
 Welfare in Sweden

References

Society of Sweden
Government agencies of Sweden
Social security in Sweden